Abdellah Taouane (born 25 August 1967) is a Moroccan boxer. He competed at the 1988 Summer Olympics and the 1992 Summer Olympics.

References

1967 births
Living people
Moroccan male boxers
Olympic boxers of Morocco
Boxers at the 1988 Summer Olympics
Boxers at the 1992 Summer Olympics
Place of birth missing (living people)
Welterweight boxers